Inglewood Park Cemetery, 720 East Florence Avenue in Inglewood, California, was founded in 1905.
  A number of notable people, including entertainment and sports personalities, have been interred or entombed there.

History

The proposed establishment of "the largest cemetery in the world" was announced in November 1905, to be "on a high strip of ground two miles southwest of Los Angeles".

In 1907, a "handsome, two-story, white granite chapel" was completed at a cost of "about $40,000".

Also in 1907 the management placed an order "with the factory in the East" for a $12,000 funeral car to be used "on the electric line" that ran on a right-of-way off Redondo Boulevard (today's Florence Avenue) in front of the cemetery.

Between 1928 and 1948 Inglewood Park advertised itself as the "Largest in California," with a mausoleum, cemetery, and columbarium. From 1948 through 1950 it said it had the "Greatest number of interments in the West".

Organizers and directors

Early backers of the Inglewood Cemetery Association were Senator Robert N. Bulla, Mark G. Jones, Robert H. Raphael, Tom Hughes, P.W. Powers, Byron Oliver, B.J. or V.J. Rowan, F.K. Eckley, C.B. Hopper, Harry M. Jack, John R. Powers, George Letteau, Jennie Wild, and Will G. Nevin. Others were P.W. Powers and D.S. Patterson.

In 1907 the directors were Mark G. Jones, F.K. Eckley, Robt. N. Bulls, John C. Rupp, Robt. H. Raphael, Geo. H. Letteau, and Chas. B. Hopper. The officers were Mark G. Jones, president and treasurer; Chas. B. Hopper, vice-president; F.K. Eckley, secretary; V.J. Rowan, engineer, and Captain L.G. Loomis, superintendent.

Early burials

One of the earliest notable burials was that of Webster Street, justice of the Supreme Court of Arizona between 
1897 and 1900, on September 23, 1908.

Another was the September 12, 1908, funeral of Los Angeles city Police Chief Walter H. Auble, who was shot and killed in the line of duty. Thousands came from Los Angeles on carriages and aboard special Los Angeles Railway streetcars.

Notable interments

(Note: This is a partial list. See also :Category:Burials at Inglewood Park Cemetery.)

A
 Margaret Queen Adams (1874–1974), first woman deputy sheriff in the United States
 Jewel Akens (1933–2013), singer
 Coit Albertson (1880–1953), actor
 Curtis Amy (1929–2002), musician
 Joseph H. August (1890–1947), cinematographer
 Lloyd Avery II (1969–2005), actor

B
 Chet Baker (1929–1988), musician
 W. Lester Banks (1911–1986), American civil rights leader
 Reginald Barker (1886–1945), director
 Earl Battey (1935–2003), baseball player
 Beals Becker (1886–1943), baseball player
 Ricky Bell (1955–1984), NFL running back
 George Bennard (1873–1958), composer
 Edgar Bergen (1903–1978), actor and ventriloquist
 Wally Berger (1905–1988), baseball player
 Paul Bern (1885–1932), director, screenwriter and producer
 Richard Berry (1935–1997), singer and songwriter
 Elmer Booth (1882–1915), actor
 Margaret Booth (1898–2002), film editor
 Lyman Bostock (1950–1978), baseball player
 Fletcher Bowron (1887–1968), Los Angeles mayor and judge
 Tom Bradley (1917–1998), Los Angeles mayor
 Byron B. Brainard (1894–1940), Los Angeles City Council member
 Layne Britton (1907–1993), makeup artist
 Charles Brown (1922–1999), singer
 Nacio Herb Brown (1896–1964), composer
 Robert L. Burns (1876–1955), Los Angeles City Council member, 1929–45
 Jheryl Busby (1949–2008), former CEO of Motown Records

C

 Harry Caesar (1928–1994) singer, actor 
 Bebe Moore Campbell (1951–2006), author
 Caesar Cardini (1896–1956), credited as creator of Caesar Salad
 Horace G. Cates (1864–1911), Los Angeles County coroner
 Ray Charles (1930–2004), musician
 Thornton Chase (1847–1912), first western Baha'i, Annual memorial in September draws large crowds.
 James Cleveland (1931–1991), gospel singer, composer, arranger
 Johnnie Cochran (1937–2005), trial lawyer
 Anthony Cornero (1899–1955), bootlegger, gambling entrepreneur
 Ray "Crash" Corrigan (1902–1976), actor
 Willie Covan (1897–1989), dancer, actor
 Al Cowens (1951–2002), baseball player
 Pee Wee Crayton (1914–1985), guitarist, blues singer
 Sam Crawford (1880–1968), baseball player

D
 Julian Dixon (1934–2000), U.S. Congressman
 Badja Djola (1948–2005), actor
 Robert DoQui (1934–2008), actor
 William Duncan (1879–1961), actor

E
 Dock Ellis (1945–2008), baseball player
 Zari Elmassian Vartian (1906–1990), singer

F
 Louise Fazenda (1895–1962), actress
 Ella Fitzgerald (1917–1996), singer
 Curt Flood (1938–1997), baseball player
 Clara Shortridge Foltz (1849–1934), first female lawyer on the West Coast.
 Byron Foulger (1899–1970), actor
 Lowell Fulson (1921–1999), blues musician
 Wardell Fouse (1960-2003), implicated in the murder of the Notorious B.I.G.

G
 Hoot Gibson (1892–1962), actor
 Jim Gilliam (1928–1978), baseball player
 Betty Grable (1916–1973), actress, singer and dancer
 Leroy Milton Grider (1854–1919), Los Angeles real estate man
 Ferde Grofé (1892–1973), composer

H
 Kenneth Hahn (1920–1997), county supervisor and city council member
 Jester Hairston (1901–2000), actor, musician, arranger
 Lois Hall (1926–2006), actress
 Robin Harris (1953–1990), actor and comedian
 Helen Humes (1913–1981), singer
 Flo Hyman (1954–1986), volleyball player

J
 Bud Jamison (1894–1944), actor
 James J. Jeffries (1875–1953), world heavyweight boxing champion
 Etta James (1938–2012), singer

K
 Robert Kardashian (1944–2003), attorney, businessman
 Kirk Kerkorian (1917–2015), businessman
 Brady Keys (1936–2017), football player
 Cecil R. King (1898–1974), U.S. Congressman
 Jerry Knight (1952–1996), musician
 Fred Kohler (1888–1938), actor

L
 Allan "Rocky" Lane (1909–1973), actor
 Walter Lang (1896–1972), film director
 Lucille La Verne (1872–1945), actress
 Gypsy Rose Lee (1911–1970), actress and burlesque dancer
 Lillian Leitzel (1892–1931), acrobat
 Evan Lewis (1869–1941), Los Angeles City Council member
 Walter Lindley (1852–1922), Los Angeles physician and educational leader

M
 D'Urville Martin (1939–1984), actor, producer and director
 Lee Maye (1934–2002), baseball player
 Fred McMullin (1891–1952), baseball player
 Irish Meusel (1893–1963), baseball player
 Louis Meyer (1904–1995), race car driver
 Cleo Moore (1928–1973), actress
 Juanita Moore (1914–2014), actress
 Ernest "Sunshine Sammy" Morrison (1912–1989), actor
 Herbert Mundin (1898–1939), actor
 Don Myrick (1940–1993), musician

N

 Gordon W. Norris (1907–1961), poet laureate of California

O
 Fred Offenhauser (1888–1973), automotive inventor
 Orval Overall (1881–1947), Major League Baseball Pitcher

P
 LaWanda Page (1920–2002), actress and comedian
 George H. Peck (1856–1940), real estate broker & developer
 Lawrence Phillips (1975–2016), NFL running back
 Billy Preston (1946–2006), singer and songwriter
 George W. Prince (1854–1939), U.S. Congressman
 Brad Pye, Jr. (1931–2020), sports journalist and broadcaster

R

 Robert Riskin (1897–1955), screenwriter
 Sugar Ray Robinson (1921–1989), World Champion boxer
 LaTasha "MC Trouble" Rogers (1970–1991), rapper
 Cesar Romero (1907–1994), actor

S
 Evelyn Selbie (1871–1950), actress
 Blanche Sewell (1898–1949), editor
 Frank L. Shaw (1877–1958), Los Angeles mayor
 Orfa Jean Shontz (1876–1954), the first woman in California to "sit on the bench and administer justice"
 Charles A. Siringo (1855–1928), author
 Myrtle Stedman (1883–1938), actress
 Slim Summerville (1892–1946), actor
 Big Syke (1968–2016), rapper
 Sylvester (1947–1988), singer

T
 Richard Talmadge (1892–1981), actor and film director
 David Torrence (1864–1951), Scottish-born actor
 Billie "Buckwheat" Thomas (1931–1980), actor
 Big Mama Thornton (1926–1984), singer and songwriter

V
 Joseph W. Vance (1841–1927), military officer

W
 T-Bone Walker (1910–1975), musician
 Bobby Wallace (1873–1960), baseball Hall of Famer
 Lalomie Washburn (1941–2004), singer songwriter
 Laura L. Whitlock (1862–1934), mapmaker
 Larry Williams (1935–1980), singer and actor
 Paul Williams (1894–1980), architect
 Murry Wilson (1917–1973), musician, record producer, businessman, and father of Brian, Dennis, and Carl Wilson of the Beach Boys
 Parke Wilson (1867–1934), baseball player
 Arthur Winston (1906–2006), centenarian 
 John Downey Works (1847–1928), U.S. Senator
 Syreeta Wright (1946–2004), singer

Y
 Carleton G. Young (1907–1971), actor
 Lee Thompson Young (1984–2013), actor (service held here; buried in South Carolina)

See also

 List of United States cemeteries
 Centinela Park, located across the street

References
References to burials or entombments at this cemetery can be found in the articles if not listed below.

External links
 Inglewood Park Cemetery website
 Inglewood Park Cemetery at Find a Grave

Cemeteries in Los Angeles County, California
Buildings and structures in Inglewood, California
1905 establishments in California
Tourist attractions in Inglewood, California